Antanas Račas (August 28, 1940 – February 9, 2014) was a Lithuanian politician. In 1990 he was among those who signed the Act of the Re-Establishment of the State of Lithuania.

Račas graduated from Sakiai District Kiduliai secondary school. In 1962–1967, studied Germanic languages in Vilnius University where he received a degree in philology. He later worked in various schools. In 1976, was fired from Kelme District Saukenai secondary school for "relations with anti-Soviets and clerics".
 
Until 1990 Račas worked in Kelme Secondary school No. 2 as a teacher of the German language. Participated in the activity of Sąjūdis (Reform Movement of Lithuania), was Chairman of the Sajudis Council in Kelme District. After the events of January 1991, the Committee of Foreign Affairs established Lithuanian Information Bureau in Huttenfeld (Germany), Anatanas Račas was Head of the bureau until 18 November 1991. Račas was also the founder of Lithuanian Samaritan Community.
 
In 1990–1992, Račas was elected to the Supreme Council-Reconstituent Seimas. As a member of the then Homeland Union – Lithuanian Christian Democrats was a Member of the Seimas since 25 November 1996.

References

Biography

1940 births
2014 deaths
Members of the Seimas